The 2013 FIBA Asia Under-16 Championship was the qualifying tournament for FIBA Asia at the 2014 FIBA Under-17 World Championship. The tournament was held in Tehran, Iran from September 25 to October 4.

China successfully defended their title against the first time finalists, the Philippines, 85-78, in the championship match considered as the most competitive finals so far in FIBA Asia Under-16 Championship history. Both teams, as well as Japan, who defeated Chinese Taipei for the bronze medal, 85-72, will represent FIBA Asia in the 2014 FIBA Under-17 World Championship in United Arab Emirates in 2014.

Qualification 

According to the FIBA Asia rules, the number of participating teams in the 2013 FIBA Asia Under-16 Championship was set at sixteen (16). Each zone had two places, and the hosts (Iran) and holders (China) were automatically qualified. The other four places were allocated to the zones according to performance in the 2011 FIBA Asia Under-16 Championship.

* Withdrew.

** Only 3 teams registered from West Asia.

Draw

Preliminary round

Group A

|}

Group B

|}

Group C

|}

Group D

|}

Second round

Group E

|}

Group F

|}

Classification 9th–12th

Semifinals

11th place

9th place

Final round

Quarterfinals

Semifinals 5th–8th

Semifinals

7th place

5th place

3rd place

Final

Final standing

Awards

References

FIBA Asia Under-16 Championship
2013–14 in Asian basketball
2013–14 in Iranian basketball
International basketball competitions hosted by Iran